Wohlfahrtia pachytyli is a species of flesh fly in the family Sarcophagidae.

Range
South Africa, Angola & Namibia.

References

Sarcophagidae
Insects described in 1919